Jelow Girangeh (also Romanized as Jelow Gīrāngeh and Jelow Gīrangeh) is a village in Cheshmeh Kabud Rural District, in the Central District of Harsin County, Kermanshah Province, Iran. At the 2006 census, its population was 23, in 6 families.

References 

Populated places in Harsin County